Guilherme "Gui" Borges Guedes (born 17 April 2002) is a Portuguese professional footballer who plays as a midfielder for Spanish club CD Lugo, on loan from UD Almería.

Club career
A youth product of Santa Marta and Vitória Guimarães, Guedes signed his professional contract with Vitória on 1 May 2019. He made his professional debut with Vitória Guimarães in a 4-1 Taça da Liga win over Leixões on 26 July 2021.

On 23 June 2022, Guedes moved abroad and signed a six-year deal with UD Almería, recently promoted to La Liga. Initially assigned to the reserves, he made his first team debut on 13 November, starting in a 2–0 away loss against CD Arenteiro, for the season's Copa del Rey.

On 3 February 2023, Guedes was loaned to Segunda División side CD Lugo for the remainder of the campaign.

References

External links
 
 
 

2002 births
Living people
People from Santa Marta de Penaguião
Portuguese footballers
Portugal youth international footballers
Vitória S.C. players
Vitória S.C. B players
Primeira Liga players
UD Almería B players
UD Almería players
CD Lugo players
Campeonato de Portugal (league) players
Tercera Federación players
Association football midfielders
Sportspeople from Vila Real District
Portuguese expatriate footballers
Portuguese expatriate sportspeople in Spain
Expatriate footballers in Spain